Social union is the integration of social policy among several nations or states.

See also
Fiscal union

External links
European Social Union: a political necessity and an urgent research programme

Economic integration
Social policy